Laurie Kaine (born 24 February 1952) is a former Australian rules footballer who played with Collingwood in the Victorian Football League (VFL).

Notes

External links 

1952 births
Australian rules footballers from Victoria (Australia)
Collingwood Football Club players
Coleraine Football Club players
Living people